Triathalassothia is a genus of toadfishes found in the southwest Atlantic Ocean.

Species
There are currently two recognized species in this genus:
 Triathalassothia argentina (C. Berg (es), 1897)
 Triathalassothia lambaloti Menezes & J. L. de Figueiredo, 1998

References

Batrachoididae